Athiaporn Koonjarthong (born 12 October 1968) is a Thai sprinter. He competed in the men's 4 × 400 metres relay at the 1992 Summer Olympics.

References

1968 births
Living people
Athletes (track and field) at the 1992 Summer Olympics
Athiaporn Koonjarthong
Athiaporn Koonjarthong
Place of birth missing (living people)